This is the discography of Jamaican musician Elephant Man.

Albums

Studio albums

Compilation albums

Extended plays

Singles

As lead artist

In 2019 he released the song "Find It".

As featured artist

Guest appearances
The following is a list of songs Elephant Man appears with other artists, usually remixes:
 "All Nite (Don't Stop)" (So So Def Remix) by Janet Jackson featuring. Elephant Man
 "All Nite (Don't Stop)" (Kwamé Stimulated Remix) by Janet Jackson featuring. Elephant Man
 "Are You Feelin' It?" by the Teddybears featuring. Elephant Man - Soft Machine
"Digydance" by Digydon featuring. Elephant Man, & MC Bacon
 "Get Low (Remix)" by Lil Jon & The Eastside Boyz featuring. Ying Yang Twins, Busta Rhymes & Elephant Man - Part II
 "Pon de Replay (Remix)" by Rihanna featuring. Elephant Man - Music of the Sun
 "Reggae Bump Bump" by R. Kelly featuring Elephant Man - TP-3: Reloaded
 "Shake (Remix)" by Ying Yang Twins featuring Pitbull & Elephant Man - Money Is Still A Major Issue
 "Switch (Reggae Remix)" by Will Smith featuring Elephant Man - Lost & Found
 "U Sexy Girl" by Fatman Scoop featuring Elephant Man & Jabba - U Sexy Girl
 "Agony (song)" (Remix) by Dub J featuring Sumeet, Broadway & Elephant Man
 "What U Gon' Do (Jamaican Remix)" by Lil Jon & The Eastside Boyz featuring Elephant Man & Lady Saw - Crunk Juice
 "Shake That Booty (Krumpa Remix)" by David Banner featuring Elephant Man - Certified
 "Shake Baby Shake (Seeed Remix)" by Seeed featuring Elephant Man - What You Deserve Is What You Get – EP
 "Ishq Naag" by RDB featuring Elephant Man -  PUNJABI
 "Whine Up" by Kat DeLuna featuring Elephant Man -  9 Lives
 "Robbery (Remix)" by Killah Priest featuring Elephant Man & Savoy - Black August
 "Get Wild (Bonus Track)" by Lil Skeeter featuring Elephant Man - "Midwest Mastermind"
 "China Wine" by Sun featuring Wyclef Jean, Elephant Man and Tony Matterhorn
 "Throw Your Hands Up" by Teddybears STHLM featuring Elephant Man and Harry Toddler of Scare Dem Crew -  Rock 'n' Roll Highschool
 "Money In The Bank" (Remix) by Swizz Beatz featuring Young Jeezy, Eve & Elephant Man
 "Spin Ya Rag" by Lil Jon & DJ Ideal featuring Elephant Man - The BME Mixtape
 "Kung Faux" Series by Mic Neumann featuring Elephant Man
 "Wall To Wall (Remix) by Chris Brown featuring Elephant Man
 "Umbrella (Remix) by Rihanna featuring Elephant Man
 "Pegao (Remix)" by Wisin & Yandel featuring Elephant Man - Caribbean Connection
 "Latinas" by Zion & Lennox featuring Elephant Man - Caribbean Connection
 "Cut Dem Off" by Ricky Blaze featuring Tony Matterhorn & Elephant Man
 "Satisfaction" by PUSHIM featuring Elephant Man'
 "Church Heathen" by Shaggy (Mega Mix Promo) featuring Shelly Thunder, Elephant Man, Ninjaman, Redd Foxx, Adrian Banton, Rayvon & ky)
 "Busketeer (Ghetto Yout Fi Rich)" by Kano featuring Elephant Man

Music videos

References

Discographies of Jamaican artists
Reggae discographies